Q36.5 Continental Team is a UCI Continental cycling team, initially registered in South Africa but now registered in Italy. Until 2021 the team acted as a feeder team to the UCI WorldTeam, . Since 2023, it acts as the development team for UCI ProTeam .

Team roster

Major wins
2016
 U23 National Road Race Championship, Stefan de Bod
 U23 National Time Trial Championship, Stefan de Bod
 National Road Race Championship, Bonaventure Uwizeyimana
 Overall Tour of Rwanda, Valens Ndayisenga
Stages 2 & 6, Valens Ndayisenga
Stage 5, Metkel Eyob
2017
 U23 National Road Race Championship, Stefan de Bod
 U23 National Time Trial Championship, Stefan de Bod
Stage 5a Girobio, Joseph Areruya
 Overall Tour of Rwanda, Joseph Areruya
Stages 1 & 3, Joseph Areruya
Stages 4 & 6, Metkel Eyob
2018
Overall Coupe des Nations de l'Espoir Blue Line, Joseph Areruya 
Stage 3, Samuel Mugisha
 U23 National Road Race Championship, Stefan de Bod
Gran Premio Palio del Recioto, Stefan de Bod
Coppa della Pace, Matteo Sobrero
Stage 2 Tour of Rwanda, Samuel Mugisha
2019
Giro del Belvedere, Samuele Battistella
G.P. Palio del Recioto - Trofeo C&F Resinatura Blocchi, Matteo Sobrero
Circuito del Porto - Trofeo Arvedi, Luca Mozzato
Overall Tour de Limpopo, Samuele Battistella
Stage 2, Connor Brown
Stage 3, Samuele Battistella
 U23 National Time Trial Championship, Matteo Sobrero
2021
 U23 National Time Trial Championship, Marc Pritzen
 National Road Race Championship, Marc Pritzen

National champions
2016
 South African U23 Road Race, Stefan de Bod
 South African U23 Time Trial, Stefan de Bod
 Rwanda Road Race, Bonaventure Uwizeyimana
2017
 South African U23 Road Race, Stefan de Bod
 South African U23 Time Trial, Stefan de Bod
2018
 South African U23 Road Race, Stefan de Bod
2019
 Italy U23 Time Trial, Matteo Sobrero
2021
 South African U23 Time Trial, Marc Pritzen
 South African Road Race, Marc Pritzen

References

External links

Cycling teams based in South Africa
2016 establishments in South Africa
Cycling teams established in 2016
Cycling teams based in Italy